The Convention of Gramido was an agreement signed on 29 June 1847, in Casa Branca on the town square of Gramido, in Valbom, Gondomar, Portugal, to end the civil war of the Septembrists against the Cartistas known as the Patuleia.  The Convention was signed by the commanders of the Spanish and British military forces that had entered Portugal on behalf of the Quadruple Alliance, the representative of the Portuguese government in Lisbon, and the representatives of the Junta in Porto. It sealed the defeat of the Septembrists.

Text
Tenente General D. Manoel de la Concha, Conde de Cancellada, e o Coronel Buenaga como representantes da Espanha, o Coronel Wilde como representante da Grã-Bretanha, o Marquês de Loulé, par do reino, e o General César de Vasconcelos, como representantes da Junta Provisória, reunidos em Gramido com o fim de concertar as necessárias medidas para dar pacífico cumprimento às resoluções das Potências Aliadas, concordaram em que a cidade do Porto se submeteria à obediência do Governo de Sua Majestade Fidelíssima [a Rainha de Portugal] com as condições estabelecidas nos 8 artigos que vão escritos no fim da acta.
(...)
Artigo 1.º — O fiel, e exacto cumprimento dos 4 artigos da mediação incluídos no Protocolo de 21 de Maio deste ano é garantido pelos Governos Aliados.
Artigo 2. º— As tropas de Sua Majestade Católica [a rainha de Espanha] exclusivamente ocuparão desde o dia 30 de Junho a cidade do Porto, Vila Nova de Gaia, e todos os fortes, e redutos de um e outro lado do rio enquanto a tranquilidade não estiver completamente estabelecida sem receio de que possa ser alterada pela sua ausência, ficando na Cidade do Porto uma forte guarnição das forças Aliadas enquanto estas se conservarem em Portugal. No mesmo tempo o Castelo da Foz será ocupado por forças inglesas, e no Douro estacionarão alguns vasos de Guerra das potências Aliadas.
Artigo 3.º — A época da entrada das tropas Portuguesas na Cidade do Porto será marcada pelas potências Aliadas.
Artigo 4.º — A propriedade e segurança dos habitantes da Cidade do Porto, e de todos os Portugueses em geral, ficam confiados à honra, protecção e garantia das potências Aliadas.
Artigo 5.º — As forças do exército de Sua Majestade Católica receberão as armas dos corpos de linha e voluntários que obedecem à Junta entregando-se guia ou passaporte gratuito às pessoas que tiverem de sair do Porto para as terras da sua residência, e dando-se baixa aos soldados de linha que tiverem completado o tempo de serviço, e aos que se alistaram durante esta luta para servirem só até à sua conclusão.
Artigo 6.º — O Exército da Junta será tratado com todas as honras da guerra sendo conservadas aos oficiais as espadas e cavalos de propriedade sua.
Artigo 7.º — Conceder-se-ão passaportes a qualquer pessoa, que deseje sair do Reino podendo voltar a ele quando lhe convenha.
Artigo 8.º — As três potências Aliadas empregarão os seus esforços para com o Governo de Sua Majestade Fidelíssima a fim de melhorar a condição dos oficiais do antigo exército realista
— (...) — Gramido, 29 de Junho de 1847.

Consequences
The civil war that so frightened queen Maria II was thus ended and, despite talking in reconciliatory terms, the queen and the other leaders of the winning side remained truly resentful against the defeated Septembrists, not alway showing them the clemency they could justly expect.  As a result of that attitude, the defeated were hunted down which created a new climate of instability that would inevitably lead to new revolt.  This revolt broke out in 1851, and that would become known as the "Regeneração" (Regeneration).

The revolution of the Maria da Fonte was one of the outstanding episodes of the political history of Portugal in the 19th century.  Among the many famous men in that movement who would afterwards become very popular, the two brothers Passos (José da Silva Passos and Manuel da Silva Passos), Rodrigo da Fonseca Magalhães, José Estêvão Coelho de Magalhães, Manuel de Jesus Coelho and others. These figures would mark the political history of Portugal later in the nineteenth century.

1847 in Portugal
1847 treaties
Gramido
Peace treaties of Portugal
Gondomar, Portugal